Fred Rubi (12 October 1926 – 5 September 1997) was a Swiss alpine skier. He competed in three events at the 1952 Winter Olympics.

References

External links
 

1926 births
1997 deaths
Swiss male alpine skiers
Olympic alpine skiers of Switzerland
Alpine skiers at the 1952 Winter Olympics
Sportspeople from Bern